Hampton is a surname of English origin.

List of people with the surname
Barry Hampton, New Zealand cricketer
Bruce Hampton, American musician
Charles Hampton (disambiguation), several people
Christopher Hampton, British playwright
Dan Hampton, American football player
Dave Hampton, American football player
David Hampton, American con artist
Exie Lee Hampton (1893–1979), African-American educator, community leader and clubwoman
Fred Hampton, African American activist and deputy chairman of the Illinois chapter of the Black Panther Party
Howard Hampton, leader of the Ontario New Democratic Party
Ike Hampton, American baseball player
James Hampton (disambiguation), several people
Jean Elizabeth Hampton, American philosopher
John Hampton (disambiguation), several people
Karen Hampton (disambiguation), several people
Kimberly Hampton, first female military pilot to be shot down and killed in U.S. service
Lionel Hampton, American  jazz musician
Martin L. Hampton, architect
Michael Hampton (disambiguation), multiple people
Millard Hampton, American athlete
Neil Hampton, Scottish curler
Nick Hampton (born 1967), British businessman
Nick Hampton (American football) (born 2000), American football player
Rodney Hampton, American football player
Saquan Hampton (born 1995), American football player                       
Shanola Hampton, Black American actress
Trevor Hampton, founder of the first scuba diving center in Britain
Wade Hampton (disambiguation), several people
William Hampton (disambiguation), several people

English toponymic surnames